The Canterbury Cathedral Close Constables are a cathedral constabulary employed by Canterbury Cathedral to maintain order and security in and around the cathedral. They have the same police powers as regular police in the United Kingdom, including the power of arrest, within the cathedral and its precincts.

The current head constable is Superintendent James Morley.

History
To professionalise security the Dean and Chapter, the body that administers Canterbury Cathedral, formed (resurrected) its own constabulary in 2016.

Uniform and equipment
Everyday uniform for the Constables wear black cargo trousers, a black duty shirt/white shirt and tie displaying their Constabulary number and peaked cap with a blue and white Sillitoe tartan band.

For ceremonial duties, a formal dark tunic, dark trousers and white shirt and tie are worn, along with the peaked cap. State medals (if issued) are worn on the left breast and Cathedral Constable Association (CCA) medals are worn on the right.

Since 2016 the close constables have been permitted to use personal protection equipment, including a protective vest, handcuffs and a PR-24 tactical baton.

See also
 York Minster Police
 Liverpool Cathedral Constables
 Chester Cathedral Constables
 Cathedral constable
Law enforcement in the United Kingdom
List of law enforcement agencies in the United Kingdom

References

External links
 Official website

Police forces of England
Church law enforcement agencies